Sacred Spirit is a German musical project by Claus Zundel, Ralf Hamm, Pecy and Markus Staab. The music is of electronic, new age, world and ambient genres. Sacred Spirit's total worldwide album sales are estimated to be over 15 million copies. For each album sold, donations are made to the Native American Rights Fund, a non-profit Native American organization devoted to restoring the legal rights of Native Americans.

History
The first album, Chants and Dances of the Native Americans was released in 1994. The album was nominated for best New Age album Grammy Award. In keeping with the Native American theme, Zundel adopted the pseudonym 'The Fearsome Brave', and on his many other projects he is simply credited as 'The Brave'. The music conveys the stories, legends and plight of the Native Americans by combining sampled chants of the Navajo, Pueblo and Sioux tribes and Sami people yoik with synthesizer backings, all driven forth by a combination of traditional drumming and electronic dance-beats. The first single released off the album was "Yeha-Noha" (Wishes of happiness and prosperity) which was largely responsible for catapulting Sacred Spirit into the limelight. The single reached #1 position in number of countries, including 6 weeks at #1 in France. In the US, "Yeha Noha" sung by Navajo elder Kee Chee Jake of Chinle, Arizona reached top 20 in Billboard Hot 100. The album is arguably one of the most successful enigmatic projects ever, garnering sales of more than seven million albums worldwide. It reached top 10 and charted for twenty seven weeks in the UK Albums Chart.

A second album was released by Sacred Spirit, but it was a complete divergence from the original. The focus this time was around the blues singing of America. In keeping with the change of theme, the American release saw the group name also being changed, to Indigo Spirit.

Virgin Records released the third Sacred Spirit album in 2000. The album was nominated for best New Age Grammy Award in 2001. This time the project's name was slightly altered to Indians' Sacred Spirit (and in some areas even that was abbreviated to Indians' Spirit), probably to inform listeners that it was different from the second album. The subtitle is More Chants and Dances of the Native Americans. The album continues the mood and production of the first, however the album was more instrumental. Although all the tracks did feature chants or speech, each song was composed of many short samples pieced together, unlike the first album which tended to use one extended sample per song.

In 2003, two Sacred Spirit albums were released on Higher Octave music label. The first one, Jazzy Chill Out, featured the vocal samples from  Lightnin' Hopkins, John Lee Hooker, Anita O'Day and Ella Fitzgerald.

On the other 2003 album, Bluesy Chill Out, Zundel collaborated with fellow Ibiza resident Dave “BK” Jeffs, a Northern Ireland native and former street musician, who plays regularly at a local club named Teatro Perera. Each track was created organically, with Jeffs (who also sings and plays flute and harmonica) composing improvisational slide and steel guitar riffs as a foundation for The Brave to build upon.

Controversy

On the first album, the song "The Counterclockwise Circle Dance" was presented as a native American chant, however the main vocals are an authentic Sami yoik ("Normo Jovnna" by Terje Tretnes), recorded in 1994 by Dutch Channel 4 during an interview as an example of a yoik. The recording, despite Channel 4's denial of having sold it, then ended up in a Virgin Records studio in the Netherlands. The Sami organisation Sámi kopiija demanded royalties from Virgin Records but this has so far been unsuccessful.

Discography

Studio albums

Remix albums

Extended plays

Singles

References

External links
Sacred Spirit official site
 
Nrk.no
Virginmusic.de
Archive.greengalactic.com
Archive.greengalactic.com
Home.global.co.za

New-age music groups
Ambient music groups